The Museo Regional de Arqueología de la Democracia ("Regional Archaeological Museum of La Democracia") is an archaeological museum in the municipality of La Democracia in the department of Escuintla in Guatemala. The museum displays pre-Columbian Mesoamerican artefacts from the Pacific lowlands datingfrom the Preclassic Period through to the Postclassic Period, with a particular emphasis upon the local Monte Alto culture. The museum is open from Tuesday through to Saturday from 8 am to 4 pm.

Location
The museum is situated opposite the central park of La Democracia, which is notable for its display of large prehispanic sculptures in the potbelly style.

History
The museum was founded in February 1966 at the instigation of Rubén Chévez van Dorne, who had regularly been given pre-Columbian ceramic pieces by teachers working on a cotton plantation in the neighbouring municipality of La Gomera, who observed that archaeological remains were frequently uncovered by tractors. The museum was placed in a school building that was refurbished by INGUAT, the Guatemalan Institute of Tourism; it had previously housed the Escuelas Urbanas de la Democracia. The museum opened its doors on 22 May 1972. As part of the refurbishment, Guatemalan artist Guillermo Grajeda Meno painted 21 murals within the museum.

Collection
Aside from its archaeological collection, the museum possesses an exhibition of modern art by Guatemalan artists, displayed on the upper floor. The museum also holds a collection of historical books and documents. The anthropomorphic sculpture of a head outside the museum entrance was loaned for two months for display at the Metropolitan Museum of Art in New York.

Notes

Sources

Museo Regional de Arqueologia de la Democracia
Archaeological museums in Guatemala
Art museums established in 1972
Museo Regional de Arqueologia de la Democracia
Mesoamerican art museums